"SloMo" is the debut single by Cuban-Spanish singer Chanel Terrero. The song represented Spain in the Eurovision Song Contest 2022 in Turin, Italy, finishing in third place.

Context 
In a press conference, Chanel reported that the song spoke of "empowerment, to feel comfortable with your body, strong, big and stepping well, put on your crown and twerk to the ground. It is impossible not to get up from the chair."

It was said that one of the songwriters, Arjen Thonen, wrote the song with Jennifer Lopez in mind; however, Lopez never responded to his submission. It was later revealed that this was not true.

Eurovision Song Contest

Benidorm Fest 2022 
"SloMo" competed in Benidorm Fest 2022, a song festival organised by TVE used to select Spain's entry for the Eurovision Song Contest. Thirteen artists and songs competed over three shows: two semi-finals on 26 and 27 January 2022 and the final on 29 January 2022. Each semi-final featured six or seven songs and four qualified for the final. The results of each show were determined through a combination of public voting, a demoscopic jury and an expert jury. The fourteen competing acts were announced on 10 December 2021, while the competing songs were premiered on 21 December 2021.

"SloMo" won the first semi-final with 110 points, and subsequently won the final with 96 points. In the semi-final, "SloMo" received the most points from the expert and demoscopic juries, while in the final, "SloMo" received the most points from the expert, and "Terra" by Tanxugueiras won the demoscopic and the televote.

"SloMo" only got 3.97%  of the televote, being in third place against "Ay mamá" by Rigoberta Bandini with 18.08% and "Terra" by Tanxugueiras with 70.75%.

Upon winning the competition, the authors were accused of plagiarizing Serbian singer Dara Bubamara's 2017 single "Extravagantno", written by Stefan Đurić and Slobodan Veljković, by Bubamara herself and Đurić.

At Eurovision 
The 66th edition of the Eurovision Song Contest took place in Turin, Italy and consisted of two semi-finals on 10 and 12 May, and the grand final on 14 May 2022. According to Eurovision rules, all nations with the exceptions of the host country and the "Big Five" (France, Germany, Italy, Spain and the United Kingdom) were required to qualify from one of two semi-finals in order to compete for the final; the top ten countries from each semi-final progressed to the final. As a member of the "Big Five", Spain automatically qualified to compete in the final on 14 May 2022. In addition to its participation in the final, Spain was also required to broadcast and vote in one of the two semi-finals. This was decided via a draw held during the semi-final allocation draw on 25 January 2022, when it was announced that Spain would vote in the second semi-final. The song finished in 3rd place with 459 points and gave Spain its best ever result in number of points, receiving 12 points from 8 different juries and giving Spain its best result since 1995.

Track listing
Digital download and streaming
 "SloMo" – 2:56

Digital download and streaming – Eurovision's Dancebreak Edit
 "SloMo" (Eurovision's Dancebreak Edit) – 3:00

7-inch single

Charts

Weekly charts

Year-end charts

Certifications

References 

2022 songs
2022 singles
BMG Rights Management singles
Eurovision songs of 2022
Eurovision songs of Spain
Number-one singles in Spain
Songs written by Leroy Sanchez
Songs written by Keith Harris (record producer)
Songs involved in plagiarism controversies